Marjab is the name of several people. These include:

 a Christian priest martyred with Desan and several others in 355
 a Christian deacon martyred with Abda and Abdjesus in 366